Fields may refer to:

Music
Fields (band), an indie rock band formed in 2006
Fields (progressive rock band), a progressive rock band formed in 1971
Fields (album), an LP by Swedish-based indie rock band Junip (2010)
 "Fields", a song by Sponge from Rotting Piñata (1994)

Businesses
 Field's, a shopping centre in Denmark 
 Fields (department store), a chain of discount department stores in Alberta and British Columbia, Canada

Places in the United States
 Fields, Louisiana, an unincorporated community
 Fields, Oregon, an unincorporated community
 Fields (Frisco, Texas), an announced planned community
 Fields Landing, California, a CDP

Other uses
 Fields (surname), a list of people with that name
 Fields Avenue (disambiguation), various roads
 Fields Institute, a research centre in mathematical sciences at the University of Toronto
 Fields Medal, for outstanding achievement in mathematics
 Caulfield Grammarians Football Club, also known as The Fields
 FIELDS, a spacecraft instrument on the Parker Solar Probe

See also 
 Mrs. Fields, an American franchisor in the food industry
 Marshall Field's, a former department store chain in Illinois, United States
 
 Field (disambiguation)
 The Fields (disambiguation)